The 2003–04 NBA season was the 58th season for the Boston Celtics in the National Basketball Association. During the offseason, the Celtics acquired Raef LaFrentz, a teammate of Paul Pierce from the University of Kansas, from the Dallas Mavericks. The Celtics roster move continued in December when Tony Battie and Eric Williams were both traded to the Cleveland Cavaliers for Ricky Davis. In February, Mike James was traded to the Detroit Pistons for Lindsey Hunter and Chucky Atkins in a three-team trade involving the Atlanta Hawks. However, Hunter was waived after the trade and later re-signed with the Pistons. The team also released Vin Baker, who signed as a free agent with the New York Knicks.

Celtics head coach Jim O'Brien resigned after a 22–24 start to the season. He was replaced by John Carroll for the remainder of the season. However, the Celtics would lose 12 of their first 13 games under Carroll. When General Manager Danny Ainge stated that the Celtics would be better off missing the playoffs, the statement seemed to motivate the team as they posted a 9–5 record in March. The Celtics, despite finishing fourth in the Atlantic Division with a low 36–46 record, qualified for the playoffs as the number 8 seed first NBA team to reach the playoffs with below .500 record since the 1996–97 Los Angeles Clippers which was also swept by the Utah Jazz that postseason and the last team to finished 36–46 record with below .500 record to reach the playoffs until the New Orleans Pelicans reached their mark in the 2021–22 season. They were swept in four games by the Indiana Pacers in the opening round. Pierce was selected for the 2004 NBA All-Star Game. Following the season, Carroll was fired as coach and replaced by Doc Rivers, who also fired by the Orlando Magic after 1–10 start.

Draft picks

Roster

Regular season

Season standings

Record vs. opponents

Game log

Playoffs

|- align="center" bgcolor="#ffcccc"
| 1
| April 17
| @ Indiana
| L 88–104
| Paul Pierce (20)
| Paul Pierce (10)
| three players tied (4)
| Conseco Fieldhouse16,605
| 0–1
|- align="center" bgcolor="#ffcccc"
| 2
| April 20
| @ Indiana
| L 90–103
| Paul Pierce (27)
| Mark Blount (10)
| Chucky Atkins (6)
| Conseco Fieldhouse17,347
| 0–2
|- align="center" bgcolor="#ffcccc"
| 3
| April 23
| Indiana
| L 85–108
| Ricky Davis (16)
| Mark Blount (8)
| Ricky Davis (7)
| FleetCenter17,680
| 0–3
|- align="center" bgcolor="#ffcccc"
| 4
| April 25
| Indiana
| L 75–90
| Paul Pierce (27)
| Mark Blount (13)
| Walter McCarty (5)
| FleetCenter16,389
| 0–4
|-

Transactions

Trades

Free Agents

References

See also
2003–04 NBA season

Boston Celtics seasons
Boston Celtics
Boston Celtics
Boston Celtics
Celtics
Celtics